Kajavan or Amiranlar is a village that is, de facto, in the Martuni Province of the breakaway Republic of Artsakh; de jure, it is in the Khojavend District of Azerbaijan, in the disputed region of Nagorno-Karabakh. The village had an Azerbaijani-majority population before they escaped the fighting of the First Nagorno-Karabakh War.

History 
During the Soviet period, the village was part of the Martuni District of the Nagorno-Karabakh Autonomous Oblast.

Economy and culture 
The village is part of the community of Martuni.

Demographics 
The village had an ethnic Armenian-majority population of 99 inhabitants in 2005.

References

External links 
 

Populated places in Martuni Province
Populated places in Khojavend District